The 2000 Los Angeles Galaxy season was the club's fifth season of existence, and their fifth-consecutive season in Major League Soccer, the top division of the American soccer pyramid.

The club's season was highlighted by winning the 2000 CONCACAF Champions' Cup, becoming the second American club to ever win a CONCACAF club tournament. It was also the second major trophy that the Galaxy earned, the first being the Supporters' Shield in 1998.

Club

Roster

Team management

Competitions

Major League Soccer

Tables

Western Division

Overall

Source: MLSSoccer.com
Rules for classification: 1st points; 2nd head-to-head record; 3rd goal difference; 4th number of goals scored.
(SS) = MLS Supporters' Shield; (E1) = Eastern Division champion, (C1) = Central Division champion, (W1) = Western Division champion
Only applicable when the season is not finished:
(Q) = Qualified for the MLS Cup Playoffs, but not yet to the particular round indicated; (E) = Eliminated from playoff-contention.

MLS Cup Playoffs

Quarterfinals

Los Angeles Galaxy advance 6-0 on points.

Semifinals

Kansas City Wizards advance 1-0 in series overtime (SDET) after 4-4 tie on points.

U.S. Open Cup

CONCACAF Champions' Cup

Statistics

Goalscorers

Transfers

References

LA Galaxy seasons
Los Angeles Galaxy
Los Angeles Galaxy
Los Angeles Galaxy
2000